Saïd Hireche is a French-Algerian rugby union player who currently plays for CA Brive and is an Algerian international. He plays as a Flanker.

References

External links
itsrugby.fr profile

French rugby union players
Living people
French sportspeople of Algerian descent
1985 births
CA Brive players
Stade Français players